Filip "Heinrich" Hałucha (born 14 October 1980) is a Polish metal musician. He is the current bassist for Vesania and Masachist, and is a former bassist for Decapitated, Rootwater and UnSun.

Gear
 Mayones Slogan 5
 Ampeg B4R amp
 Sansamp Bass Driver
 EBS Multidrive
 B.C. Rich Bernardo 5
 Ampeg SVT6Pro
 Ampeg SVT810E classic
 Sansamp RBI, MXR M80
 BBE sonic maximizer 362

Discography
 As band member
 Vesania - Firefrost Arcanum (2003, Empire Records)
 Vesania - God the Lux (2005, Napalm Records, Empire Records)
 Rootwater - Limbic System (2007, Mystic Production)
 Vesania - Distractive Killusions (2008, Napalm Records, Mystic Production)
 Rootwater - Visionism (2009, Mystic Production)
 UnSun - The End of Life (2008, Century Media)
 Masachist - Death March Fury (2009, Witching Hour Productions)
 UnSun - Clinic for Dolls (2010, Mystic Production)
 Decapitated - Carnival Is Forever (2011, Nuclear Blast)
 Masachist - Scorned (2012, Selfmadegod Records)

 As session musician
 So I Scream - 6Shooter EP (2009, So I Scream)
 Gortal - Blastphemous Sindecade (2008, Pagan Records)
 Hate - Crusade:Zero (2015, Napalm Records)
 Other
 Obscure Sphinx - Anaesthetic Inhalation Ritual (2011, Fuck the Tag, production)
 Dragon's Eye - The New Age (2011, Dragon's Eye, sound engineering, mix, mastering)
 Leash Eye - V.I.D.I. (2011, Metal Mind Productions, sound engineering)
 Lostbone - Ominous (2012, Metal Mundus Records, sound engineering, mix, mastering)
 Hate - Solarflesh – A Gospel of Radiant Divinity (2013, Napalm Records, sound engineering)
 Leash Eye - Hard Truckin' Rock (2013, Metal Mind Productions, sound engineering, mix, mastering)
 Corruption - Devil's Share (2014, Metal Mind Productions, sound engineering, mix, mastering)

References

External links

Decapitated (band) members
Living people
1980 births
Polish heavy metal bass guitarists
People from Legionowo
21st-century bass guitarists